Nieuwerbrug is a village in the Dutch province of South Holland. It is a part of the municipality of Bodegraven, and lies about 5 km west of Woerden.

The statistical area "Nieuwerbrug", which also can include the surrounding countryside, has a population of around 1270.

References

Populated places in South Holland